Make Someone Happy is the second studio album by Sophie Milman. The album was released on June 19, 2007.

Track listing

References

Sophie Milman albums
2007 albums
Linus Entertainment albums
Juno Award for Vocal Jazz Album of the Year albums